Shah Bahram may refer to:
 Shah Bahram, Fars
 Shah Bahram, Kavar, Fars Province
 Shah Bahram, Kohgiluyeh and Boyer-Ahmad